HNLMS Banckert (F810) was a frigate of the . The ship was in service with the Royal Netherlands Navy from 1980 to 2003. The frigate was named after Dutch naval hero Joost Banckert. The ship's radio call sign was "PADD".

Dutch service history
HNLMS Banckert was built at KM de Schelde in Vlissingen. The keel laying took place on 25 February 1976 and the launching on 30 September 1978. The ship was put into service on 29 October 1980.

The ship was added to STANAVFORLANT on 7 January 1983 and met with the other ships on 20 January in Plymouth.

She left on 6 November where she served as station ship from 17 November 1989 until 19 May 1990.

On 14 May 1993 the vessel was decommissioned and was sold to the Hellenic Navy.

Greek service history

The ship was commissioned 14 May 1993 in the Hellenic Navy as part of the Elli class where the ship was renamed Aigaion (Aegean) using the radio call sign "SZDR".

Notes

Kortenaer-class frigates
1978 ships
Ships built in Vlissingen